In metrology, the realisation of a unit of measure is the conversion of its definition into reality.  The International vocabulary of metrology identifies three distinct methods of realisation:
Realisation of a measurement unit from its definition.
Reproduction of measurement standards.
Adopting a particular artefact as a standard.

The International Bureau of Weights and Measures maintains the techniques for realisation of the base units in the International System of Units (SI).

Overview
The Oxford English Dictionary defines the word "realise" (also spelt "realize") as "to convert (something imagined, planned, etc.) into real existence or fact."  The International vocabulary of metrology identifies three distinct ways in which this is done - the first being the realisation of a measurement unit from its definition, the second the reproduction of measurement standards and the third the process of actually adopting a particular artefact as a standard.

Techniques

Time
The realisation of time has gone through three phases. During both the first and second phases, man used solar time—during the first phase, realisation of time was by observing the earth's rotation using such devices as the sundial or astrolabe.  During the second phase actual timing devices such as hourglasses or clocks were used. If the user needed to know time-of-day rather than elapsed time, clocks were synchronized with astronomical time.  The third phase made use of clocks that were sufficiently accurate that they could measure variations in the earth's rotation—such clocks taking over from the rotation of the earth as the prime measure of time.

Direct measurement of solar time
sundials and astrolabes

Timekeepers
accuracy of clocks

Time generators
radiation frequency & SI

Length
Units of length, along with mass (or weight) and time, are one of the earliest quantities that was measured by man.  Historically two distinct approaches were used - one was to use a naturally occurring phenomenon such as a particular seed or part of the human body, the other was to use a standard length that was held by a community leader.  
natural units - barleycorn, feet
regal units - measures held by ruler
using speed of light
An example of a modern realisation is the realisation of the meter in terms of optical frequency standards.

Volume
jugs etc. in ancient times
not a base unit in SI

Mass
grains
artefacts held by governments (e.g. the IPK)
Kibble balance & Avogadro experiment

Electric charge
silver nitrate deposits
force between conductors
charge on the electron

Temperature
freezing & boiling water
non-linearity etc.
Boltzmann's constant

Photometry
sensitivity of the eye

Amount of substance
development of the mole

References

Systems of units